is a Japanese novel written by Sugaru Miaki, illustrated by Shōichi Taguchi and first published by ASCII Media Works on December 25, 2013. The novel received a manga adaptation by mangaka Suzuka called , with it being published by Shueisha on their website and smartphone app Shōnen Jump+, and then compiled on print volumes.

Plot
Unable to make ends meet in Japan with his part-time job, 20 year old Kusunoki prepares to sell the last of his possessions. After visiting a library to sell books, the clerk tells Kusunoki of a place where he can sell his lifespan for actual money. Everything between how impactful someone is to the world and how many people you have affected is taken into consideration for your lifespan. After a complicated path towards this fabled place, he enters the store and meets a mysterious girl named Miyagi. After a couple hours for his evaluation, Kusunoki is informed his lifespan is only worth ¥300,000 (about $2000), abysmally lower than the universal average. Realizing that his future is worthless, he decides to sell it keeping only 3 months so he may enjoy the money. The next day he awakens to Miyagi knocking on his door. As a policy of the company, she was sent to watch over Kusunoki for the next 3 months until his death. What follows is an introspective journey pondering themes such as potential, true happiness, and what makes time valuable.

Characters

Kusunoki
A 20 year old man who sold his 30 year worth lifespan for 300 thousand yen.
Miyagi
A young woman who is a clerk from the lifespan store who became Kusunoki's observer over the next three months.
Himeno
Kusunoki's childhood friend whom he had a crush on.

Media

Novel
Written by Sugaru Miaki and illustrated by Shōichi Taguchi,  Three Days of Happiness was published in a single volume by ASCII Media Works under their Media Works Bunko imprint on December 25, 2013.

The novel was licensed for English release in North America by Yen Press; it was released on October 20, 2020.

Manga
A manga adaptation of the novel by Shōichi Taguchi, was serialized on Shueisha's Shueisha's website and smartphone app Shōnen Jump+ from August 10, 2016, to October 25, 2017. Shueisha collected its chapters in three tankōbon volumes, released from July 4 to December 4, 2017.

References

2013 Japanese novels
2016 manga
Anime and manga based on novels
Drama anime and manga
Japanese romance novels
Japanese webcomics
Media Works Bunko
Romance anime and manga
Shōnen manga
Shueisha manga
Supernatural anime and manga
Webcomics in print
Yen Press titles